William Eugene Bishop (May 8, 1931 – May 14, 1998) was an American football defensive lineman who played 10 seasons in the National Football League.

A former United States Air Force member, he played college football at North Texas State from 1949 to 1951. Much of his pro career was spent with the Chicago Bears; although he was drafted by the Pittsburgh Steelers, he was traded to Chicago shortly after. He spent nine seasons with the Bears, remaining close with his teammates but frequently clashing with coach George Halas for salary reasons; in 1960, Bishop remarked, "Halas brainwashes you so much you don't want to play with anybody else; it's like playing for the New York Yankees." Bishop later became team captain of the inaugural Minnesota Vikings in 1961.

In the early 1970s, he coached the Winfield Giants Pop Warner team in Winfield, Illinois.

References

1931 births
1998 deaths
People from Borger, Texas
American football defensive tackles
North Texas Mean Green football players
Chicago Bears players
Minnesota Vikings players
Western Conference Pro Bowl players
Winfield, Illinois
United States Air Force airmen